The Besar Island bent-toed gecko (Cyrtodactylus batucolus) is a species of gecko endemic to Besar Island in Malaysia.

References

Cyrtodactylus
Reptiles described in 2008